Ricardo Espalter Arrieta (Montevideo, 14 April 1924 - Maldonado, 20 March 2007) was a Uruguayan actor and comedian.

Biography
In the 1960s he started a long career on television. Together with a notable group of Uruguayan humorists (Eduardo D'Angelo, Enrique Almada, Julio Frade, Berugo Carámbula, Henny Trayles, Raimundo Soto), he was part of several successful humor programs: Telecataplúm, Jaujarana, Hupumorpo, Comicolor, Híperhumor, Decalegrón.

Very cherished by the public of Uruguay and Argentina, he was notable for his expressive facial gestures. He showed an indescribable worried face which suddenly changed attitude, provoking the hilarity of the public.

In 1974 he received the Martín Fierro Award.

Television 
 Telecataplúm (1962)
 Jaujarana (1969-1972)
 Hupumorpo (1974-1977)
 Comicolor (1980-1983)
 Híperhumor (1984-1989)
 Decalegrón (1977-2002)
 Son de diez (1992-1995)

Cinema
 La raya amarilla (corto) (1962)
 La Industria del matrimonio (1964)
 Cómo seducir a una mujer (1967)
 ¡Quiero besarlo, señor! (1973)
 Los irrompibles (1975)
 La Película (1975)
 La noche del hurto (1976)
 La Fiesta de todos (1978)
 Toto Paniagua, el rey de la chatarra (1980)
 El telo y la tele (1985)
 Los taxistas del humor (1987)
 La pandilla aventurera (1990)
 El dirigible (1994) 
 Maldita Cocaína (2000)

Bibliography

References

External links

 Ricardo Espalter, una ofrenda permanente al humor 
 Several videos of Ricardo Espalter
 

1924 births
2007 deaths
Uruguayan people of Catalan descent
People from Montevideo
Uruguayan actors
Uruguayan male comedians
20th-century comedians
Burials at the Cementerio del Norte, Montevideo